Unchon Up Airport(은천읍비행장) is an airport in Hwanghae-namdo, North Korea.

Facilities 
The airfield has a single grass runway 02/20 measuring 2500 x 128 feet (762 x 39 m).

References 

Airports in North Korea
South Hwanghae